The following is a list of Manitoba provincial trunk highways and provincial roads. Provincial Trunk Highways are the primary highways, and Provincial Roads are the secondary highways.

Primary Routes

These Provincial Trunk Highways are numbered from 1 to 99 for mainline routes and 100 to 199 for loop/spur routes (only four currently exist).

Provincial Trunk Highways 1 and 75, as well as the Perimeter Highway (PTH 100/PTH 101), are the most important and are divided highways for most of their length with some sections at expressway or freeway standards.  PTHs 1A (Brandon), 3, 4, 7, 8, 9, 9A, 10, 12, 14, 16, 44, 52 and 59 also have some divided sections.  Speed limits are generally 90 km/h (55 mph) to 110 km/h (70 mph).

Secondary Routes
These Provincial Roads are numbered from 200 to 632.  Some of these routes are gravel for part or all of their length.  The speed limit is generally 80 km/h (50 mph) to 100 km/h (65 mph).

Former Secondary Routes
PR 208 (PTH 12 in Zhoda to PR 201 east of Vita) - became part of PR 302 in 1985-1986.
PR 209 (Section) - Section from PTH 59 to PR 200 decommissioned during the 1992 Great Decommissioning, with the section south and west of PR 218 becoming part of PR 218. Rest now Road 5N.
PR 219 (PTH 59 to Saint Georges) - rerouted directly to PR 304 in 1976 and became part of PR 304 in 1977.
PR 223 (PTH 7 to PTH 9 in Lower Fort Garry) - became part of PTH 67 in 1983.
PR 224 (Section) - Section to Fisher Branch became part of PR 228 in 1979, and then PTH 17 in 1983.
PR 226 (PTH 8 to PR 233) - became part of PR 233 during the 1992 Great Decommissioning.
PR 228 (PTH 8 to Hodgson) - section from PTH 7 to PR 325 was redesignated as PTH 17 in 1983. Remainder became part of PTH 17 in 1987.
PR 233 (Section) - Section from PR 226 east to PR 326 became part of PR 326 and section from PR 326 north three blocks, east three block, north three blocks, and east to PR 234 decommissioned during the 1992 Great Decommissioning. Section south and east of PR 234 became part of PTH 8 in 1987 and the concurrency with PR 234 was dropped.
PR 234 (Section) - Section from PTH 329 to then-PTH 233 became part of PTH 8 in 1987.
PR 235 (Sainte Rose du Lac to PTH 6) - became part of PTH 68 in 1987.
PR 241 (Lido Plague Road to PR 334 near Headingley) - decommissioned in 2013.
PR 249 (Macdonald to west of Poplar Point) - Decommissioned during the 1992 Great Decommissioning. Now Main Street and Road 71N.
PR 256 (Section) - Section from PR 251 (This section now decommissioned) directly northward deleted in 1973 and rerouted on a route 2 miles east.
PR 258 (Neepawa to Cartwright) - became part of PTH 5 in 1980.
PR 260 (Section) - Section from PR 261 to PTH 50 at Alonsa decommissioned during the 1992 Great Decommissioning.
PR 262 (Section) - Section from PR 263 near Scandinavia east and north to Riding Mountain National Park decommissioned during the 1992 Great Decommissioning.
PR 263 (PR 262 near Scandinavia to Riding Mountain National Park) - Decommissioned during the 1992 Great Decommissioning with parts being transferred to PR 262 and PR 270 (this is PR 354 after 1997), and rest in now Reid Road.
PR 270 (Section) - Section east to PTH 10 transferred to PTH 354 in 1997.
PR 277 (Saskatchewan boundary to Baden) - Changed to PTH 77 in 1987.
PR 300 - Decommissioned in 2020. Route was never signed. Now St. Anne's Road and Hallama Drive.
PR 303 (Section) - Section west to PR 200 decommissioned during the 1992 Great Decommissioning. Now Ridge Road, PR 216, and Road 34N (College Avenue and Otterburne Road).
PR 306 (first use) (PTH 15 to north of Garson Station) - Decommissioned during the 1992 Great Decommissioning. Now Dundee–Garson Road.
PR 316 (PTH 44 to PR 317) - Decommissioned during the 1992 Great Decommissioning. Now Road 48E/Allegra Road.
PR 318 (PR 303 (now Road 34 North) to PR 311) - Decommissioned during the 1992 Great Decommissioning. Now Loeppky Road.
PR 344 (first use) (Brandon to PTH 23 south of Dunrea) - Decommissioned during the 1992 Great Decommissioning. Now 65 Street E, Road 105W, Road 49N, Road 104W, PR 453 and PR 340, and unnamed roads. 
PR 347 (Section) - Section from then-PR 454 to PR 254 decommissioned during the 1992 Great Decommissioning. Now Road 36N, Road 132W, and Road 33N, PR 541.
PR 350 (Section) - Section from then-PR 461 south, west, south, and west to PTH 34 decommissioned during the 1992 Great Decommissioning.
PR 359 (Section) - Section from Vista east to 3 miles east of PR 266, north 2 miles east to PR 354, and north, east, and south to PR 270 decommissioned during the 1992 Great Decommissioning, with the part north, east, and south of PR 354 being transferred to PR 354.
PR 360 (Sections) - Sections from PTH 50 to PR 480 and from then-PR 581 to PTH 68 decommissioned during the 1992 Great Decommissioning.
PR 366 (Section) - Section from PTH 10 to PR 268 decommissioned during the 1992 Great Decommissioning. Section from PTH 10 to PR 587 restored in 2007 in exchange for eliminating PR 587 east of there due to a bridge removal. PR 366 extended over the remaining portion of PR 587.
PR 382 (PR 391 to Thompson Airport) - transferred to PR 391 in 1970.
PR 391 (Section) - Section west of Thompson transferred to PTH 6 and PTH 39 in 1987.
PR 400 (PTH 23 in Dufrost to PR 217) - Decommissioned during the 1992 Great Decommissioning.
PR 402 (PR 201 in Sundown to PTH 12) - Decommissioned during the 1992 Great Decommissioning. Now Road 53E and Sundown Road.
PR 407 (PR 204 to PR 202) - Decommissioned during the 1992 Great Decommissioning. Now Ludwick Road.
PR 412 (PTH 26 to PR 227) - Decommissioned during the 1992 Great Decommissioning. Now Meadows Road and Road 6W.
PR 413 (PTH 7 to PTH 8 in Petersville) - Decommissioned during the 1992 Great Decommissioning. Now Road 87N and Hall Road.
PR 414 (PR 411 to PTH 6 in Lake Francis) - Decommissioned during the 1992 Great Decommissioning. Now Road 18N.
PR 420 (PR 247 to PTH 75 in Glenlea) - Decommissioned during the 1992 Great Decommissioning. Now Rochon Road and Glenlea Road.
PR 424 (Section) - Section from PTH 1 to PR 427 rebuilt to the west.  Now Lido Plage Road.
PR 429 (PR 200 to PTH 59) - Became part of PR 210 in 1985-1986.
PR 431 (PTH 23 to St. Leon) - Decommissioned during the 1992 Great Decommissioning. Now Chemin Messner.
PR 434 (PTH 3 to Lake Minnewasta) - Decommissioned in 2002-2003.
PR 441 (PTH 1 in Elkhorn to PTH 83) - Decommissioned during the 1992 Great Decommissioning. Now Road 69N.
PR 446 (PTH 3 to Turtle Mountain Provincial Park) - Decommissioned during the 1992 Great Decommissioning.
PR 447 (PTH 83 to PR 254) - Decommissioned during the 1992 Great Decommissioning. Section west of PR 452 became part of PR 452, and the rest now Road 22N.
PR 451 (PR 344 to PR 340 in Treesbank) - became part of PR 340 in 1990, and part of PR 530 during the 1992 Great Decommissioning.
PR 454 (PTH 2 to PR 347) - Became part of PR 347 during the 1992 Great Decommissioning as the section of PR 347 west of there were decommissioned.
PR 456 (PTH 3 to PR 251) - Decommissioned in 1973. Was three miles east of current PR 256 (which at the time went on a north-south route 2 miles west of its current route).
PR 460 (PTH 16 to PR 264) - Decommissioned during the 1992 Great Decommissioning. Now Road 65W.
PR 461 (PTH 34 to PR 242) - Decommissioned during the 1992 Great Decommissioning. Section east of PR 350 became part of PR 350.
PR 465 (Section) - Section from PR 464 to PTH 5 decommissioned during the 1992 Great Decommissioning. Now Road 75N.
PR 466 (Section) - Section from PTH 16 to PR 357 decommissioned during the 1992 Great Decommissioning. Now Franklin Road and Road 95W.
PR 467 (Section) - Section from PTH 41 to Saskatchewan decommissioned during the 1992 Great Decommissioning. Now Road 77N.
PR 468 (Section) - Section from PR 353 to PR 465 decommissioned during the 1992 Great Decommissioning. Now Road 101W.
PR 472 (first use) (PTH 45 in Vista to PTH 16) - Decommissioned during the 1992 Great Decommissioning. Now Road 140W.
PR 473 (PTH 10 to PTH 16 near Newdale) - Decommissioned during the 1992 Great Decommissioning. Now Road 91N.
PR 477 (PR 264 to PTH 21) - Decommissioned in 1984. Now Road 93N.
PR 479 (PTH 16/83 to PR 476) - Decommissioned during the 1992 Great Decommissioning. Now Road 116N.
PR 511 (PTH 6 to PR 518) - Decommissioned during the 1992 Great Decommissioning. Now Road 103N.
PR 514 (PR 325 west of Ashern to PTH 68) - Decommissioned during the 1992 Great Decommissioning. Now Old 514.
PR 515 (PTH 8 to PTH 9 in Clandeboye) - Decommissioned during the 1992 Great Decommissioning. Now Clandeboye Road.
PR 516 (PR 233 (this section no longer a PR road) east two blocks, south one block, east one block, and south to PR 329) - Decommissioned during the 1992 Great Decommissioning.
PR 517 (PR 322 to PR 236) - Decommissioned during the 1992 Great Decommissioning. Now Road 85N.
PR 518 (Section) - Section from PR 415 to PR 229 decommissioned during the 1992 Great Decommissioning. Now Ideal Road.
PR 522 (PR 421 via Halbstadt to PR 243) - Decommissioned during the 1992 Great Decommissioning. Now Road 4E.
PR 523 (PR 332 to PTH 75) - Decommissioned during the 1992 Great Decommissioning. Now Road 19N, Sewell Road, Road 21N.
PR 526 (PR 249 to PTH 26) - Decommissioned during the 1992 Great Decommissioning. Now Road 30W.
PR 528 (PTH 3 to Kaleida) - Decommissioned during the 1992 Great Decommissioning.
PR 530 (first use) (PTH 23 to PR 245 in Bruxelles) - Decommissioned during the 1992 Great Decommissioning. Now Road 64W.
PR 541 (first use) (PTH 5east and south to PR 442) - Decommissioned during the 1992 Great Decommissioning.
PR 561 (PTH 10 to PR 468) - Decommissioned during the 1992 Great Decommissioning. Now Road 65N, Road 105W, Road 67N.
PR 562 (PR 265 to PR 357) - Transferred to PR 466 in 1984. Decommissioned during the 1992 Great Decommissioning. Now Road 95W.
PR 563 (PR 270 to PTH 10) - Decommissioned during the 1992 Great Decommissioning. Now Road 81N.
PR 564 (first use) (PR 262 east 3 miles, north 2 miles, east 1 mile, and north 1 mile to PR 471) - Decommissioned during the 1992 Great Decommissioning.
PR 565 (PTH 41 to Saskatchewan) - Decommissioned during the 1992 Great Decommissioning. Now Road 82N.
PR 573 (PTH 50 to Hollywood Beach) - Decommissioned during the 1992 Great Decommissioning.
PR 581 (PTH 5 to PR 360) - Became part of PR 360 during the 1992 Great Decommissioning.
PR 585 (PR 364 to PR 276) - Decommissioned during the 1992 Great Decommissioning. Now an unknown road and Road 160N. 
PR 586 (PTH 83 north of Durban to PTH 83) - Decommissioned during the 1992 Great Decommissioning, with the section north of PR 486 becoming part of PR 486. Rest now Road 192N and an unnamed road.
PR 587 (PR 266 in Bowsman to PR 268) - Decommissioned in 2006, with the section west of PR 366 becoming part of PR 366.
PR 589 (PTH 83 to PR 592) - Decommissioned during the 1992 Great Decommissioning. Now Road 141N.

See also

List of Winnipeg City Routes

References

External links
Road Signs of Manitoba by Mark O'Neil
Official Highway Map of Manitoba
Manitoba Infrastructure-PTH & PR Locations

Manitoba
 
Highways